"Kill the Director" is a song by English indie rock band the Wombats. Originally released in 2007, the song reached number 35 on the UK Singles Chart. The track was re-released as a download and 7-inch single in 2008 with the 7-inch only being available from the band's website, this time reaching number 48 on the UK chart. The 7-inch re-releases contain cover versions of "There She Goes" by the La's and "Bleeding Love" by Leona Lewis.

Formats and track listings

First release
UK CD single
 "Kill the Director"
 "Kill the Director" (KUT FM live acoustic session)

UK 7-inch single (purple)
A. "Kill the Director"
B. "Metro Song"

UK 7-inch single (red)
 "Kill the Director"
 "Kill the Director" (CSS Remix)

Second release
UK CD single
 "Kill the Director"
 "There She Goes" (live from Triple J)

UK 7-inch single 1
 "Kill the Director"
 "Sunday TV"

UK 7-inch single 2
 "Kill the Director"
 "Bleeding Love"

Chart performance
On 6 July 2008, Kill the Director entered the UK Singles Chart at number 93 on downloads alone. The following week, the song moved up to number 48 following the physical release.

Weekly charts

Certifications

References

The Wombats songs
14th Floor Records singles
2007 singles
2007 songs
Songs written by Dan Haggis
Songs written by Matthew Murphy
Songs written by Tord Øverland Knudsen